The 2018 FIA European Rallycross Championship was the 43rd season of the FIA European Championships for Rallycross Drivers. The season consists of nine rounds across three categories; Supercar, Super1600 and TouringCar. This season is confirmed as the final season for TouringCar. The season commenced on 14 April with the Spanish round at the Circuit de Barcelona-Catalunya, and culminated on 13 October in Germany at the Estering.

Swede Anton Marklund is the defending Supercar champion, Hungarian Krisztián Szabó the defending Super1600 champion and Norwegian Lars Øivind Enerberg the defending TouringCar champion.

Steve Volders was crowned the TouringCar champion on 18 August 2018 after champion-elect Sivert Svardal was disqualified from the final round in Höljes.

Calendar

Entry list

Supercar

Super1600

TouringCar

Championship standings
European championship points are scored as follows:

A red background denotes drivers who did not advance from the round

(key)

Supercar

a Loss of fifteen championship points – stewards' decision

Super1600

TouringCar

a Disqualified by stewards' decision

See also
2018 in rallycross

References

European Rallycross Championship seasons
European Rallycross Championship
FIA European Rallycross Championship